The Gucherre Cricket Ground is a cricket ground, in Albergaria, near to the city of Santarém. 

In August 2021, the ground was the venue for the first ever Twenty20 Internationals (T20Is) to be held in Portugal, when Portugal's team hosted a tri-nation series against Malta and Gibraltar between 19 and 22 August 2021. These were the first official T20I matches to be played in Portugal since the International Cricket Council (ICC) granted full T20I status to all competitive matches between its members from 1 January 2019.

References

External links 
 Cricket

Cricket grounds in Portugal
Sports venues in Portugal